Champion Sounds is the fourth album released by Roc Raida.  It was released on October 7, 2003 for DMC Records and featured production by Roc Raida, Rob Swift, D-Styles and DJ Radar.

Track listing
"Intro"- 0:26  
"Hip Hop Shit"- 3:41  
"On the Cut"- 2:12  
"Bang Bang"- 3:58  
"Hit 'Em Off"- 4:31  
"Hip Hop on Wax"- 2:42  
"All Hail to My Hands"- 4:19  
"Scratch Break"- 1:45  
"I Got You"- 4:11  
"Shout Out"- 0:23  
"Raida's Theme"- 4:37  
"The Murder Faktory"- 4:58  
"The Funky Beat"- 3:24  
"The Cipha"- 3:23  
"Burn That Ass"- 3:52  
"Love It"- 4:49  
"Sub Level"- 3:36  
"What More Can I Say"- 3:27

2003 albums
Roc Raida albums